Onkel Joakims hemmelighed, also known as Nyhavns glade gutter, is a 1967 Danish family film directed by Carl Ottosen and starring Gunnar Lauring.

Cast
Gunnar Lauring as Viktor Erdner
Sigrid Horne-Rasmussen as Emilie Erdner
Vivi Bach as Eva Erdner
Kai Holm as Joakim Nielsen
Povl Wøldike as Count von Flagen
Per Pallesen as Count Horace von Flagen
Preben Mahrt as Lawyer Frost
Willy Rathnov as Sailor Rasmus
Paul Hagen as Viggo
Ole Wisborg as Svend
Karl Stegger as Morten Hansen
Poul Bundgaard as The chef Søren
Dirch Passer as The Masterthief
Bodil Udsen as Waitress Mona Lisa
Kirsten Peüliche as Waitress Vicki
Preben Kaas as Esben Andersen
Arthur Jensen as Peter Jensen
Ove Sprogøe as CEO Schwartz
André Sallyman as Max
Bent Vejlby as Max
William Kisum as Esben
Susanne Bruun-Koppel as Misse
Marianne Kjærulff-Schmidt as Irene
Ulla Johansson as Bitten
Lisbeth Lindeborg as Rosa
Peer Guldbrandsen as The Florist
Marchen Passer as Maid
Mogens Brandt as Psychiatrist Count von Flagen
Jessie Rindom as Countess von Flagen

References

External links

1967 films
Danish children's films
1960s Danish-language films
Films directed by Carl Ottosen
Films scored by Sven Gyldmark